Michalis Simigdalas (born 23 June 1944) is a Greek former professional footballer who played as midfielder.

Club career
Simigdalas started in the infrastructure departments of AEK Athens, under Giorgos Daispangos and was promoted to the first team in 1963. His coextistanse with many great players of the time did not allowed him to establish himself in the club, however he stayed at the club for 6 seasons. A member of the squad that won second place in the Balkans Cup in 1967, losing only in the final by Fenerbahçe. He was a regular player in the team that reached the quarter-finals of the European Cup in 1969. During his spell at AEK, he won the Championship in 1968 season and 2 Cups.

In the summer of 1969, he left AEK and played for Apollon Athens, where his older brother Nikos also played. He left Apollon, due to argues with their coach, but also disappointed by the behavior of a part of the fans towards them, while they also had pending financial issues with the team's management. In the summer of 1972, he moved to Panegialios. In the summer of 1974, he was transferred to Acharnaikos. He played for Athinaikos and Ilioupoli for one season each, before returning to Athninaikos to end his career in 1978.

Personal life
His brother, Nikos was also a footballer, who played mainly for Apollon Athens, where they played together, while he was also his coach at Ilioupoli.

Since the end of his career as a footballer, Simigdalas is constantly "close" to his beloved AEK, while he also has a very strong participation in their Veterans' Association. He is also the coach of the veteran team of AEK.

Honours

AEK Athens
Alpha Ethniki: 1967–68
Greek Cup: 1963–64, 1965–66

References

1944 births
Living people
Super League Greece players
AEK Athens F.C. players
Apollon Smyrnis F.C. players
Panegialios F.C. players
Acharnaikos F.C. players
Athinaikos F.C. players
Ilioupoli F.C. players
Association football midfielders
Footballers from Athens
Greek footballers